A toy camera is a simple, inexpensive film camera.

Despite the name, toy cameras are fully functional and capable of taking photographs, though with optical aberrations due to the limitations of their simple lenses. From the 1990s onward, there has been interest in the artistic use of such cameras or recreation of this style, both with cameras originally designed for children, and others originally intended as mass-market consumer cameras. 

Many professional photographers have used toy cameras and exploited the vignetting, blur, light leaks, and other distortions
of their inexpensive lenses for artistic effect to take award-winning pictures.
Toy camera photography has been widely exhibited at many popular art shows, such as the annual "Krappy Kamera" show at the Soho Photo Gallery in the Tribeca neighborhood of New York City. Various publications such as Popular Photography magazine have extolled the virtues of the Diana camera in its own right as an "art" producing image maker. Several books have also featured the work of toy cameras such as The Friends of Photography's The Diana Show, Iowa by Nancy Rexroth, and Angels at the Arno by Eric Lindbloom.

Lomography 

Lomography is a photographic style which involves taking spontaneous photographs with minimal attention to technical details. Lomographic images often exploit the unpredictable, non-standard optical traits of toy cameras (such as light leaks and irregular lens alignment), and non-standard film processing techniques for aesthetic effect. Similar-looking techniques with digital photography, often involving "lomo" image filters in post-processing, may also be considered Lomographic.

While cheap plastic toy cameras using film were and are produced by multiple manufacturers, Lomography is named after the Soviet-era cameras produced by the​ Leningradskoye Optiko-Mekhanicheskoye Obyedinenie (LOMO).

Lomography has been a highly social pursuit since 1992, with local and international events organised by The Lomographic Society International (Lomography, a commercial company selling analogue cameras, films and accessories). The company continues to promote the Lomographic style; however, it is not necessary to use the company's products to take Lomographic photos.

"Lomography" is claimed as a commercial trademark by The Lomographic Society International, associated with a photographic image style and a film camera movement and international Lomography Community. However, it has become a genericised trademark; most camera phone photo editor apps include a "lomo" filter.

History 
The Lomography name is inspired by the formerly state-run optics manufacturer, LOMO PLC of Saint Petersburg, Russia that created and produced the 35 mm LOMO LC-A Compact Automat camera, now central to Lomography. This camera was loosely based upon the Cosina CX-1 introduced in the early 1980s. The LOMO LC-A produces "unique, colorful, and sometimes blurry" images.

The Lomographic Society International was founded in 1992 by a group of Viennese students interested in the LC-A, a camera created by LOMO PLC of Saint Petersburg, Russia. Lomography started as an art movement through which the students put on exhibitions of photos; the art movement then developed into the Lomographische AG, a commercial enterprise.

Lomography 
Lomography is a commercial company headquartered in Vienna, Austria, which sells cameras, accessories, and film.

Lomography signed an exclusive distribution agreement with LOMO PLC in 1995 — becoming the sole distributor of all LOMO LC-A cameras outside of the former Soviet Union. The new company reached an agreement with the deputy mayor of St Petersburg, the future Russian Prime Minister and President, Vladimir Putin, to receive a tax break in order to keep the LOMO factory in the city open.

Since the introduction of the original LOMO LC-A, Lomography has produced a line of their own film cameras. In 2005, production of the original LOMO LC-A was discontinued. Its replacement, the LOMO LC-A+, was introduced in 2006. The new camera, made in China rather than Russia, featured the original Russian lens manufactured by LOMO PLC. This changed as of mid-2007 with the lens now made in China as well. In 2012 the LC-A+ camera was re-released as a special edition. It costs ten times the original secondhand value of the old LOMO LC-A.

The Lomographic Society International (Lomography) has moved on to produce their own range of analogue cameras, films and accessories. Lomography has also released products catered to digital devices, such as the Smartphone Film Scanner; and several lenses such as the Daguerreotype Achromat lens collection for analogue and digital SLR cameras with Canon EF, Nikon F or Pentax K mounts, inspired by 19th century Daguerreotype photography. In 2013, together with Zenit, Lomography produced a new version of the Petzval Lens designed to work with Canon EF and Nikon F mount SLR cameras.

Some have questioned the pricing of Lomography's plastic "toy" cameras, which run from $100 to $400 US.

Models 

Cameras that have been marketed by Lomography:
 LOMO LC-A+
 LC-A 120
 Lomo LC-Wide
 Diana F+
 Diana Mini – a 35 mm version of the Diana F+
 Diana Baby - a 110 format version of the Diana F+
 Diana Multi Pinhole Operator
 Diana Instant Square
 Spinner 360° - a 360° panoramic camera
 Sprocket Rocket
 ActionSampler - a four-lensed miniature 35 mm camera
 Pop-9
 Oktomat
 Fisheye One
 Fisheye No.2
 Fisheye Baby - a 110 format version of the Fisheye No.2
 Colorsplash
 Colorsplash Flash
 SuperSampler
 La Sardina
 LomoKino – a 35 mm analog movie camera
 Konstruktor – a build-it-yourself 35 mm SLR camera
 HydroChrome Sutton’s Panoramic Belair Camera
 LomoMod No.1 – a flat-packed DIY cardboard medium format camera
 Fritz the Blitz Flash
 LomoApparat 
 Lomo'Instant 
 Lomo'Instant Automat 
 Lomo'Instant Automat Glass
 Lomo'Instant Wide

Film 
The company produces 35 mm, 120 and 110 film in color negative, black and white as well as redscale. Lomography also produces its own range of experimental color-shifting film called LomoChrome.

Photo gallery 

Photography by genre
Trademarks

See also 

 Holga, Chinese mass-market 120 film camera
 Lubitel, mass-market Russian, 120 film, twin-lens reflex cameras
 Lensbaby

References

External links
Lomography and the ‘Analogue Future’, Time, 2012

Cameras by type